KBPS (1450 AM) is a high school radio station in Portland, Oregon, owned by Portland Public Schools, and run by Benson Polytechnic High School students enrolled in its radio broadcasting program. From its founding the station has been based on the Benson campus and staffed by its students.

As part of its standard transmission, KBPS broadcasts in AM Stereo.

History
In May 1921, the Benson Polytechnic School received a government license to operate a "Technical and Training School" station with the call sign 7YK. This station utilized a spark transmitter, which was limited to Morse code dot-and-dash transmissions. In the early 1920s broadcasting was introduced, and arrangements were made to establish a school station. Equipment previously used by a short-lived station, KYG, was purchased by the student body in March 1923, and an application filed for a new broadcasting station to be operated by the students under the direction of teacher Fred Brainard.

The first broadcasting station license, with the call letters KFIF, was issued on March 23, 1923 to the Benson Polytechnic Institute. Equipment tests were begun in April, followed by an informal debut broadcast at 6:00 p.m. on May 4, 1923. A more formal station introduction, coinciding with the start of the fifth annual Benson Technical Show, was broadcast from 9:30 to 10:30 p.m on May 9th, with scheduled addresses by school director W. F. Woodward, Benson principal C. E. Cleveland, and student body president Bill Norvell, plus singing by Marguerite Carney.

KFIF's initial assignment was for broadcasting on a wavelength of 360 meters (833 kHz), a shared "entertainment" wavelength that required allocating timeslots to individual stations in order to avoid interference. In late 1924 KFIF was reassigned to 1210 kHz, which was followed by assignments to 1400 kHz in 1927, and to 1310 kHz in early 1928. On November 11, 1928, under the provision of the Federal Radio Commission's General Order 40, KFIF moved to a "local" frequency of 1420 kHz.

The school's original application requested reassignment of the KYG call letters, however the station was instead randomly assigned KFIF from an alphabetical roster of available call signs. In March 1930 the call letters were changed to KBPS (for Benson Polytechnic School), with the station's William Allingham explaining that "the letters KFIF were difficult to utter over the radio... and they were harder still to understand".

During the 1933-1934 school year, programming was added intended for local elementary school students. KBPS was transferred from the school to the School District in the fall of 1939. As of 1942, KBPS was on the air every school day from 11:00 a.m. to 1:00 p.m. and from 3:15 to 5:00 p.m. Several of the city schools had radio production instruction, and would prepare special broadcasts for the station.

In March 1941, with the implementation of the North American Regional Broadcasting Agreement, most of the stations on 1420 kHz, including KBPS, moved as a group to 1450 kHz. In 1929, KBPS had begun timesharing with another Portland station, KXL. After KXL moved to 750 kHz in October 1941, KBPS had unlimited broadcasting hours, but because it did not have enough programming to fill the available time, it was licensed with a reduced schedule as a "specified hours" station.

As of 1947, the station was broadcasting six hours each day. Patricia Green Swenson took over as general manager at this point, a post which she held until 1994. By 1954, the station's schedule was 9 a.m. to 9 p.m. Monday to Friday, which was sometimes extended for late running sports events.

Beginning in 1994, a student group at Portland State University began leasing time on the station, in order to provide college radio-style programming over KBPS for 59 hours each week, from 5 p.m. until midnight on weekdays and noon to midnight on weekends. This programming used the self-assigned identification of "KPSU radio". The contract arrangement was terminated on June 25, 2010, a week before its intended conclusion, due to KBPS management concerns that some of the programming was inappropriate for a high school station.

On July 1, 2012 KBPS suspended operations for the summer due to budget cuts, but returned to the air later that year.

References

External links

FCC History Cards for KBPS (covering 1927-1980 as KFIF / KBPS)
KBPS station history (pps.net)
"Digging in to the Early History of High School Radio Station KBPS" by Jennifer Waits, June 9, 2015 (radiosurvivor.com)
"My Visit to the Oldest High School Radio Station in the U.S.: Portland's KBPS" by Jennifer Waits, January 19, 2016 (radiosurvivor.com)
January 2022 KBPS aircheck

Further reading

 "Benson Polytechnic School", Education's Own Stations, S. E. Frost, Jr., 1937, pages 32-33.
 "Radio in the Public Schools of Portland, Oregon: The Historical Development of Educational Broadcasting in the Public Schools of Portland, Oregon, and of the Schools' Radio Station, KBPS" (PhD Dissertation) by Patricia L. Green Swenson, 1958.

High school radio stations in the United States
BPS
BPS
Radio stations established in 1923
1923 establishments in Oregon
Portland Public Schools (Oregon)